Duel is a 2017 South Korean television series starring Jung Jae-young, Kim Jung-eun, Yang Se-jong and Seo Eun-soo. It aired on OCN from June 3 to July 23, 2017 on Saturdays and Sundays at 22:00 (KST) for 16 episodes.

Synopsis
Story about Jang Deuk-cheon (Jung Jae-young), a hardened detective cop whose daughter is kidnapped. He starts to chase down the suspect using the one clue he has: Two men with the same face were at the crime scene.

Cast

Main
 Jung Jae-young as Jang Deuk-cheon
 Yang Se-jong as Lee Sung-joon / Lee Sung-hoon / Lee Yong-seob
 Kim Jung-eun as Choi Jo-hye
 Seo Eun-soo as Ryu Mi-rae

Supporting

People around Jang Deuk-cheon
  as Jang Soo-yeon
 Yoon Kyung-ho as Lee Hyung-sik
 Choi Woong as Na Soo-ho

People around Choi Jo-hye
  as Na Song-yi
 Lee Sung-wook as Go Bon-seok

People around Ryu Mi-rae
  as Kim Ik-hong

Extended

  as Park Yoo-shik
  as Cha Gil-ho
 Shim Wan-joon as Yang Man-choon
 Jang Ri-woo as Yang Man-choon's subordinate
  as Yang Man-choon's subordinate
 Joo Boo-jin as Jang Deuk-cheon's landlord
 Kim Ji-yoo as Ahn Hye-joo
  as Jin Byung-joon
  as Choi Joo-sik
 Lee Hae-young as Park Dong-seul
 Jung Jin-seo as Park Min-ji
 Kang Tae-ho as Kang Hyun-geun
 Choi Kwang-je as Department Head Baek
  as Oh Byung-cheon
 Kim Si-eun as Joo-ah
  as Director Han
 Kim Nan-hee as Kim Hye-jin
 Kim Dong-beom as Cha Ki-dong
 Song Joon-hee as Lee Sung-hoon
  as Ryu Jung-sook
 Jo Soo-hyang as Park Seo-jin
  as Han Yoo-ra
 Park Ji-il as Park San-young
  as Park Seo-ryong
  as Jang Soo-yeon's doctor-in-charge

Special appearances
  as Ahn Jung-dong (Ep. 1)
  as Hye-joo's mother (Ep. 1)
 Jung Soon-won as Operating victim (Ep. 1)
 Cuckoo Crew (Ep. 2)

Production
 Screenwriter Kim Yoon-joo is known for her hit drama Nine: Nine Time Travels, which was also co-produced by Chorokbaem Media (Duels co-producing company).
 Duel reunited Yang Se-jong and Seo Eun-soo, who appeared together in SBS's hit medical drama Romantic Doctor, Teacher Kim in 2016.
 First script reading took place March 31, 2017 in Sangam-dong, Seoul, South Korea.

Original soundtrack

Part 1

Part 2

Ratings
 In this table,  represent the lowest ratings and  represent the highest ratings.
 N/A' denotes that the rating is not known.

Notes

References

External links
  

 Dual at Studio Dragon
 Dual at Chorokbaem Media 
 

OCN television dramas
2017 South Korean television series debuts
Korean-language television shows
South Korean thriller television series
South Korean science fiction television series
South Korean crime television series
Television series about cloning
Television series by Studio Dragon
Television series by Chorokbaem Media